Medipally is a town located in Medchal Malkajgiri district of the Indian state of Telangana. It is the mandal headquarters of Medipally mandal in Keesara revenue division. It also a part of Hyderabad Metropolitan Development Authority.

Medipally town is a part of Peerzadiguda Municipal corporation.

Villages in Medipally mandal

Bibi shaeb Maqta
Boduppal
Chengicherla (part of Boduppal municipal corporation)
Gulamaliguda
Medipally

Parvathapur
Peerzadiguda

References

Villages in Medchal–Malkajgiri district